The Idaho State University Neighborhood Historic District in Pocatello, Idaho is a historic district which was listed on the National Register of Historic Places in 1984.

It is roughly bounded by 6th, 9th, Carter, and Center Streets in Pocatello.

References

National Register of Historic Places in Bannock County, Idaho
Historic districts on the National Register of Historic Places in Idaho
Colonial Revival architecture in Idaho
Buildings and structures completed in 1900